Millrace Rapids is a popular kayaking playspot, located on the Lower Saluda River in Columbia, South Carolina.

History 
The rapids are a result of the Saluda River running over the remains of a twice-dynamited coffer dam.

Features 
 Blast-O-Matic
 Dumbass Hole
 Cookie Monster
 Square Eddy
 Fisherman's Rock
 Pop-up Hole

Events and Competitions 
 Millrace Massacre and Iceman Competition

Safety Concerns 
Because the lower Saluda is flow-controlled by a hydroelectric dam (operated by Dominion Energy), the water level can change rapidly. There is a warning system in place that consists of a series of sirens and strategically placed markers.

External links 
 - American Whitewater page for the Lower Saluda River
 - SCE&G's page for the Lower Saluda River.

Canoeing and kayaking venues in the United States
Geography of Columbia, South Carolina
Bodies of water of South Carolina
Tourist attractions in Columbia, South Carolina
Rapids of the United States